Zhajiangmian (pinyin: Zhá jiàng miàn), literally "fried sauce noodles", commonly translated as "noodles served with fried bean sauce", is a Chinese dish consisting of thick wheat noodles topped with zhajiang sauce. Zhajiang sauce is normally made by simmering stir-fried diced meat or ground pork or beef with salty fermented soybean paste.  Zhajiang also means "fried sauce" in Chinese. Even though the sauce itself is made by stir-frying, this homonym does not carry over into the Classical Chinese term.

The topping of the noodles usually are sliced fresh or/and pickled vegetables, including cucumber, radish, and pickles edamame, depending on regions. Chopped omelette or in lieu of extra firm tofu can also be alongside. Low-fat dieters often use minced skinless chicken for the meat portion.

History

Origin
Zhajiangmian originates from Shandong province and is an iconic Northern Chinese dish. It is unknown how the dish came to be and only a few folktales are available.

Spread of vegetarian Zhajiangmian to Beijing
During the Guangxu era of the Qing dynasty, after the Eight-Nation Alliance invaded China and conquered Beijing, the Empress Dowager Cixi,  Emperor Guangxu and their retinues were forced to retreat from Beijing to Xi'an. On their way, the Imperial Eunuch, Li Lianying detected a pleasant aroma, and found that the smell came from a zhajiangmian restaurant. He then reported about the restaurant to Cixi and Guangxu. Due to collective fatigue and hunger after their long trip, Cixi and Guangxu decided to have a meal in the restaurant. Li Lianying ordered a bowl of vegetarian zhajiangmian. Finding it tasty, they ordered another one. After dinner, Cixi asked everyone how they found the taste of the dish. They all replied "This is definitely a good noodle. Good, good!" Shortly after, as Emperor Guangxu was about to leave and continue their trip, Cixi demanded that Li Lianying bring the chef who made the zhajiangmian to Beijing and the palace, so they could eat zhajiangmian often once they came back. This is the story of how the vegetarian zhajiangmian made its way to Beijing.

Analysis of the subjective factors such as Beijing city development in Qing and Ming dynasties, food supply, climate, people's living conditions comes to a conclusion that Bean Paste Noodles and Old Beijing Noodles with Fried Bean Sauce occurred at the same time. The symbolic sign "Old Beijing Noodles with Fried Bean Sauce" is hidden but rich in profound cultural connotation.

Types

Shandong
In Shandong cuisine, the sauce is made with tianmianjiang and this version of zhajiangmian is commonly viewed as the standard within China.

Beijing
In Beijing cuisine, yellow soybean paste and Tianmian sauce are combined to make the sauce. During the process of frying the sauce, a large amount of white scallion is added, and diced pork is used instead of ground meat. Typically the dish is served with a variety of crunchy vegetables, such as cucumber, radish, roseheart radish, bean sprouts, celery, and soybeans. Thick handmade noodles are preferred. In China, Beijing-style Zhajiangmian is the most well-known version, even over the original Shandong Zhajiangmian.

Sichuan
In Sichuan cuisine, Zajiangmian (杂酱面) is considered its own version of Zhajiangmian. 
Despite the similarity in name and contents, there is actually no clear evidence that Zajiangmian originates from Zhajiangmian. Ground meat is used instead of diced meat. doubanjiang is also added to the sauce. This results in the Zajiang meat sauce being more watery than Zhajiang sauce, and the dish is less salty. Boiled, leafy vegetables are served with the noodles. Zajiangmian is typically served in soup, but there is also a version that is mixed directly with the sauce. Chili oil and chopped green onion are usually added as toppings.

Northeast China
In Liaoning and Jilin, the Zhajiang sauce is traditionally fried with Dajiang sauce.
Ground meat is commonly used. Northeast Zhajiang sauce also has two special variations: 'Egg Zhajiang' and 'Egg and Green Chili Zhajiang' which contain no meat.

Cantonese
In Cantonese especially Hong Kong cuisine, ketchup and chili sauce is added to the base Zhajiang sauce and brings a slightly sweet, spicy, and sour flavor.

Buddhist
A vegetarian version of zhajiang sauce may be made by substituting ground beef or pork with finely diced extra firm smoked tofu (熏豆腐乾), edamame (毛豆), eggplant, or extra firm tofu (素雞). The vegetarian versions generally call for soybean paste of any sort instead of soy sauce, since the tofu chunks are larger and need more structure.

Islamic 
A halal version is often made with ground beef or lamb.

South Korea

In South Korea, zhajiangmian has evolved into jajangmyeon when workers from Shandong were sent by the Chinese military to Korea.

Japan

In Japan, zhajiangmian evolved into jajamen (じゃじゃ麺) when it was brought from Northeast China. It is a popular dish in the northern Japanese city of Morioka, Iwate and is known as one of the three great noodle dishes of Morioka (盛岡三大麺).

See also

Jajangmyeon
Jajamen
Sweet bean sauce
 List of Chinese dishes

External links
 Zhajiangmian recipe with step by step pictures

References 

Beijing cuisine
Chinese noodle dishes
Mixed noodles